Temple Cycles is a British bicycle manufacturer based in Bristol, United Kingdom, and founded by Matt Mears. The company produces road bikes, single-speeds and hybrid gravel bikes.

History 
Matt Mears founded the bicycle brand in 2014. The name Temple Cycles recalls many site names in the city of Bristol where the company began, and in which their headquarters is still situated. Many local road names include the word 'Temple', and the city's main train station is Bristol Temple Meads. One of the earliest remaining local sites of that etymology is Temple Church, built in the 12th Century, which stands on the ruins of a round church built by the Knights Templar in the Redcliffe area.

In 2017, Temple Cycles opened its first investment round with online crowdfunding platform Crowdcube. In 2022, the company followed with a second funding round.

In 2021, Temple Cycles announced their first e-bike models under the moniker Temple Electric.

In 2022, Soho House entered into partnership with Temple Cycles to provide 500 bikes to be used by guests in the Soho House group.

References

British companies established in 2014